Two ships have borne the name HMS Nith.

  was a  launched in 1905 and broken up in 1919.
  was a  launched in 1942. She was sold to Egypt in 1948 and renamed Domiat. She was sunk in 1956.

Royal Navy ship names